Cythara anthera is an extinct species of sea snail, a marine gastropod mollusk in the family Mangeliidae.

This species is considered a nomen dubium.

Description

Distribution
This extinct marine species was found in Miocene strata of the Alum Bluff Formation in Florida, USA.

References

External links
 Smithsonian Institution: Cythara anthera

anthera
Gastropods described in 1937